Khushboo Ka Ghar was a 2012 Pakistani drama serial which was Premiered on ARY Digital. The show was directed by Mohsin Raza. Faysal Qureshi, Sana Askari, Raheel Butt and Anoushay Abbasi were the Lead Actors who played Pivotal Roles in the show. Khushboo Ka Ghar was also aired on Life OK in India.

Plot
This drama starts with a happy and contented lives of a young couple, and their four young children. First the father and then the mother passes away. Their extended family decides that each of their close relatives will assume the guardianship of one child each. The siblings are separated and this emotional turmoil continues till they reach adulthood. Aiman deeply resents the fact that the four are separated and wants to reunite them; there is Abeera who is more docile and sacrificing. Then there is Fiza who is a mixture of both, and Ahmed who has been pampered to death by his paternal aunt.

Cast

Main Cast 

 Faysal Qureshi as Sikander
 Saima Qureshi as Shaila
 Sana Askari as Aiman
 Erum Akhtar as Mrs. Atif, Sarah's mother, aunt of Fiza
 Anoushay Abbasi as Fiza
 Raheel Butt as Ahmed 
 Esha Noor as Abeera

Supporting Cast 

 Seemi Pasha
 Rashid Farooqi
 Nousheen Ahmed
 Seema Seher
 Amber Arshad
 Urwa Hocane (Cameo role)

References 

Pakistani television series
ARY Digital original programming
2012 Pakistani television series debuts
Pakistani drama television series
Urdu-language television shows